François Roussely (9 January 1945 – 11 January 2023) was a French government official and magistrate.

Biography
After his studies at the École nationale d'administration, Roussely became an auditor in 1978 and subsequently became a referendum advisor at the Cour des Comptes in 1982 in the cabinet of Minister of the Interior Gaston Defferre. Additionally, he served on the nuclear energy committee of the French Atomic Energy Commission from 1991 to 1997 and was director of the civil and military cabinet of Defense Minister Alain Richard from 1997 to 1998.

From 1998 to 2004, Roussely was president of Électricité de France and was later CEO of Credit Suisse in France until 2009. He also served as Vice-President of Credit Suisse in Europe.

Roussely died on 11 January 2023, at the age of 78.

Decorations
Commander of the Legion of Honour (2012)

References

1945 births
2023 deaths
Socialist Party (France) politicians
People from Dordogne
Électricité de France people
École nationale d'administration alumni
Judges of the Court of Audit (France)
Commandeurs of the Légion d'honneur
French chief executives